Sentrin-specific protease 1 is an enzyme that in humans is encoded by the SENP1 gene.

General 

So far there are six SUMO proteases in humans that have been designated SENP1-3 and SENP5-7 (sentrin/SUMO-specific protease).1 The six proteases possess a conserved C-terminal domain which are variable in size, and with a distinct N-terminal domain between them. The C-terminal domain shows catalytic activity and N-terminal domain regulates cell localization and substrate specificity.

Features 

SENP1 (Sentrin-specific protease 1) is a human protease of 643 amino acids with a weight of 73 kDa, EC number in humans 3.4.22.B70, which adopts a conformation that identifies it as a member of the superfamily of cysteine proteases contain a catalytic triad with characterized three amino acids: a cysteine at position 603, a histidine at position 533 and aspartic acid at position 550.
The important nucleophile is cysteine located at the N-terminal alpha helix of the protein core, the other two amino acids, aspartate and histidine, are located in a beta sheet end.

Location 

Both SENP1 are located in the nucleus and cytosol depending on the cell type, although it has been seen that is exported out from the nucleus to the cytosol through a sequence of nuclear export (NES) that is located at the C-terminus. The mammalian SENP1 is localized mainly in the nucleus.

Function 
SENP1 catalyzes maturation SUMO protein (small ubiquitin-related modifier), which causes hydrolysis peptide bond of SUMO is in a conserved sequence Gly-Gly-|-Ala-Thr-Tyr at the C-terminal  to be added to the conjugation of other proteins (sumoylation). 
In vertebrates there are three members of the family of SUMO: SUMO-1, -2 and -3. SENP1 can catalyze any of these three.
This conjugation of SUMO toward other proteins is a lot like ubiquitination, however these modifications leads to different results depending on the type of protein been modified.

References

Further reading

External links